Mieczysławka may refer to the following places:
Mieczysławka, Lubartów County in Lublin Voivodeship (east Poland)
Mieczysławka, Opole Lubelskie County in Lublin Voivodeship (east Poland)